Jimmy Provencher (born March 22, 1975) is a Canadian former professional ice hockey right winger.

Provencher was drafted 247th overall by the New Jersey Devils in the 1993 NHL Entry Draft but never played in the NHL. He instead spent the majority of his career in Europe, mainly in France for Lions de Lyon, Drakkars de Caen, Scorpions de Mulhouse, Dragons de Rouen and Albatros de Brest. He also played in the SM-liiga for Lukko and the Austrian Hockey League for EC Kapfenberg.

References

External links

1975 births
Living people
Beauport Harfangs players
Brest Albatros Hockey players
Canadian ice hockey right wingers
Drakkars de Caen players
Dragons de Rouen players
Ice hockey people from Ontario
EC Kapfenberg players
LHC Les Lions players
Louisville RiverFrogs players
Lukko players
New Jersey Devils draft picks
Saint-Jean Lynx players
Scorpions de Mulhouse players
Sportspeople from Kitchener, Ontario